The Leo Islands are an island group located inside western Coronation Gulf, south of Victoria Island, in the Kitikmeot Region, Nunavut, Canada. Other island groups in the vicinity include the Berens Islands, Black Berry Islands, Couper Islands, Deadman Islands, Lawford Islands, and Sir Graham Moore Islands.

References

Islands of Coronation Gulf
Uninhabited islands of Kitikmeot Region